Harry Booth was a professional rugby league footballer who played in the 1910s and 1920s.

Notable tour matches
Harry Booth played right-, i.e. number 10, in Wakefield Trinity's 3–29 defeat by Australia in the 1921–22 Kangaroo tour of Great Britain match at Belle Vue, Wakefield on Saturday 22 October 1921, in front of a crowd of 6,000.

References

External links
Search for "Booth" at rugbyleagueproject.org

English rugby league players
Place of birth missing
Place of death missing
Rugby league props
Wakefield Trinity players
Year of birth missing
Year of death missing